Taffeltäckare (literally table coverer) is a designation for court employees in the Royal Court of Sweden with responsibility for laying out the royal table for meals and banquets.

Sources

Positions of authority
Obsolete occupations
Swedish monarchy
Ceremonial occupations
Food services occupations